The Catholic Association for International Peace was founded in 1927 by John A. Ryan.
  It based its opposition to war on the traditional just war doctrine.

It joined other religious organizations in urging a halt to the bombing of North and South Vietnam.

See also
 List of anti-war organizations

References

Further reading
 Emanuel, Cyprian William The Morality of Conscientious Objection to War Washington:Catholic Association for International Peace, 1941 OCLC 183290138
 "Catholic Association For International Peace" Advocate of Peace through Justice 90#3 (March, 1928), pp. 142–146  online

Organizations established in 1927
History of Catholicism in the United States
Peace organizations based in the United States
Christian pacifism
Anti–Vietnam War groups